A tomb is a repository for the remains of the dead.

Tomb(s) may also refer to:

 Tomb (album), by Angelo de Augustine, 2019
 Tombs (band), an American post-metal band
 Tombs (surname), a list of people with the name
 Tomb, Iran (disambiguation)
 Tomb, a disc golf putter by Infinite Discs
 The Tombs (restaurant and bar), in the Georgetown neighborhood of Washington, D.C.

See also
 The Tomb (disambiguation)
 The Tombs (disambiguation)